Kumbalam may refer to places in India:

 Kumbalam, Ernakulam, Kerala
 Kumbalam, Kollam, Kerala
 Kumbalam, Krishnagiri, Tamil Nadu